Northeastern Baptist College (NEBC) is a Baptist college located in Bennington, Vermont, United States. It is affiliated with the Baptist Convention of New England (Southern Baptist Convention).

History 
NEBC was founded in 2013 by Mark Ballard.

Accreditation 
It is affiliated with the Baptist Convention of New England (Southern Baptist Convention).

Academics 
Northeastern Baptist College is authorized by the state of Vermont to grant Associate and Bachelor degrees. NEBC is currently pursuing accreditation by the New England Association of Schools and Colleges.

NEBC offers several undergraduate degrees. Associate degrees include Biblical Studies, Music Ministry and Business. Bachelor degrees include Biblical Studies, Christian Counseling, Christian Education, and Business Administration.

Campus 
The main campus of NEBC is housed in the third and fourth floor of a former Ramada Inn and Conference Center in Bennington, Vermont. This space includes academic classrooms, faculty offices, study areas, and an auditorium that is used for chapel.

The Charles & Pauline Hogue Library is located on Main Street in downtown Bennington, about a mile from the main campus. Student housing is located at the Jehovah Jireh Hall, which is across the street from the library. The dorms house approximately 40 students.

References 

Private universities and colleges in Vermont
Universities and colleges affiliated with the Southern Baptist Convention
Educational institutions established in 2013
Buildings and structures in Bennington, Vermont
Education in Bennington County, Vermont
2013 establishments in Vermont